The Men's Scratch was one of the 10 men's events at the 2010 UCI Track Cycling World Championships, held in Ballerup, Denmark on 25 March 2010.

24 Cyclists participated in the contest. The competition consisted of 60 laps, making a total of 15 km.

Results

References

Results

Men's scratch
UCI Track Cycling World Championships – Men's scratch